Robin Davey (born 29 December 1975 in St Austell, Cornwall, England) is an English musician, record producer, musical director and photographer.

Biography
Davey was a founding member of the British blues band, The Hoax, who were signed to East West Records in 1994 and released their debut album Sounds Like This to critical acclaim. Q magazine likened the band to the Yardbirds and the Rolling Stones and gave the album a four star review. The album was produced by Mike Vernon whose early work included Fleetwood Mac and John Mayall's Blues Breakers (with Eric Clapton). Colin Larkin described them as "the great white hope of 1995".

The Hoax split in 1999 having released four albums and shortly after Davey formed the Davey Brothers, a blues rock outfit with his older brother Jesse. The duo signed to Interscope records via David A. Stewart's Weapons of Mass Entertainment Label. The Davey Brothers' song "Heart Go Faster" was featured over the closing credits in the film Lara Croft Tomb Raider: The Cradle of Life and featured on the soundtrack album. The Davey Brothers split in 2006 having never released anything through Interscope Records.

In 2004 Davey played bass guitar on the Alfie soundtrack and also performed on tracks for the Be Cool soundtrack in 2005.

In 2006 Davey directed his debut feature documentary The Canary Effect, which premiered at the Tribeca Film Festival and was also awarded the Stanley Kubrick Award for Bold and Innovative Film Making at Michael Moore's Traverse City Film Festival the same year.

In 2006 Davey also formed his current band The Bastard Fairies with Native American artist and singer Yellow Thunder Woman. The band released their debut album Memento Mori for free download late that year and shortly after signed to Adrenaline Records. In 2007 an extended physical version of the album with 5 bonus tracks was released on CD.

In 2009 Davey embarked on a European tour with his former band The Hoax. The band recorded the shows for release of a live album and DVD. In the same year, the track "Bones" from their 1998 album Humdinger was covered by Joanne Shaw Taylor on her debut album  White Sugar.

Davey recently admitted to being the creator of the Gutbucket Slim's Blues Emporium album. The album is a mash up of old blues recording featuring artists such as Lead Belly, Howlin' Wolf mixed with more contemporary artists Mos Def, Christina Aguilera and Charles Bukowski. The album is available as a free download.

2010 saw the release of the Wolfbox album from The Davey Brothers.

In 2010 Davey's band The Bastard Fairies also released the single "DIRTY SEXY KILL KILL" and EP "Man Made Monster.

In late 2010, Davey reported through his facebook page that has teamed up with singer/artist Greta Valenti for a new project called Well Hung Heart. Davey plays simultaneous guitar and bass in the three piece outfit based in Southern California. The band made their European debut in 2011 as part of "Hoaxfest"

Directing work 
In 2006, Directed the award-winning documentary, The Canary Effect.

In 2008, Davey became a part of GROWvision Studios, a creative development and production company with partner, Greta Valenti.
In 2012, Robin Davey began Directing the TV Series, "Live From Daryl's House" Hosted by Daryl Hall of Hall & Oates.

Davey has also directed a number of music videos including Buckcherry's "Too Drunk...", Drowning Pool's "37 Stitches" and Jody Raffoul's "Stay (with Me)". In 2009 Davey directed the "Black Hearts (On Fire)" video for Australian band Jet.

Music production 
In 2003 Davey produced the eponymous album from native blues rockers Indigenous. He also co-wrote 7 tracks including the top 30 AAA radio hit "C'Mon Suzie". The album reached number 3 in the Billboard Blues Charts.

Photography 
He shot the cover of actress Gina Gershon's debut album as well as the cover for The Bastard Fairies Memento Mori album, the cover to Drowning Pool's "37 Stitches" single and the UK poster for David A. Stewart's 2007 tour.

Discography

Albums 
1994 The Hoax – Sound Like This 
1996 The Hoax – Unpossible
1997 The Hoax – Humdinger
1999 The Hoax – Live Forever
2003 The Davey Brothers – Monkey Number 9 (UK only)
2006 The Bastard Fairies – Memento Mori
2008 The Bastard Fairies – "Man Made Monster"
2010 The Davey Brothers – Wolfbox
2010 The Hoax – 2010 A Blues Odyssey
2011 Well Hung Heart – "The State of America" EP
2013 Well Hung Heart – "Young Enough To Know It All"
2013 The Hoax – "Big City Blues"
2014 Well Hung Heart – "Go Forth And Multiply"
2015 Well Hung Heart - "Well Hung Heart" EP
2016 Well Hung Heart - "Live From Hybrid" EP
2017 Beaux Gris Gris - "Appetizer" EP
2018 Beaux Gris Gris - "Love and Murder"

Soundtracks 
1995 Heaven's Prisoners (featured track: The Hoax – "20 Ton Weight")
2003 Tomb Raider 2: The Cradle Of Life (featured track" The Davey Brothers – "Heart Go Faster")
2004 Alfie (Bass Guitar – Various Tracks)
2005 Be Cool (Bass Guitar – Various Tracks)

Producer 
1994 The Hoax – Sound Like This
1996 The Hoax – Unpossible
1997 The Hoax – Humdinger
2003 Indigenous – Indigenous
2006 The Bastard Fairies – Memento Mori
2010 The Bastard Fairies – "DIRTY SEXY KILL KILL" (Single)
2011 Well Hung Heart – "The State Of America" EP

Filmography 
2000 Making an Omelette (Short Film) Writer / Actor
2001 Finch (Short Film) Writer / Director / Actor
2004 Dave Stewart – "Everybody All Over The World" (Music Video) Director
2005 The Davey Brothers – "Sunshine Day" (Music Video) Director
2006 The Canary Effect – (Feature Documentary) Director / Writer / Producer
2008 Buckcherry – "Too Drunk" (Music Video) Director / Producer
2008 Drowning Pool – "37 Stitches" (Music Video) Director /  Producer
2008 Jody Raffoul – "Stay (With Me)" (Music Video) Director /  Producer
2008 Grabtime (Documentary) Writer / Director / Producer 
2009 Jet – "Black Hearts (On Fire)" Writer / Director 
2011 Papa Roach – "No Matter What (Acoustic)" Writer / Director

Awards

Music 
British Blues Connection Best British Blues Band (The Hoax) 1994, 1995, 1996, 1997, 1998.
Inductees into British Blues Connection Hall Of Fame (The Hoax) 1998

Film 
Making An Omelette – Winner BT Get Out There Awards 2000
The Canary Effect – Winner Stanley Kubrick Award For Bold and Innovative Film – Making Michael Moore's Traverse City Film Festival 2006 
The Bastard Fairies, "The Greatest Love Song" – Winner Best Music Video – American Indian Motion Picture Awards 2006

References

1975 births
Living people
English male singer-songwriters
English male guitarists
Male bass guitarists
People from St Austell
21st-century English singers
21st-century English bass guitarists
21st-century British male singers